A periaktos (plural form periaktoi, from a Greek word meaning revolving) is a device used for displaying and rapidly changing theatre scenes. It was first mentioned in Plato's Republic, in the story, "Allegory of a Cave" (c. 375 BCE), but its most intense use began in Renaissance theatre, as a result of the work of important theatrical designers, such as Nicola Sabbatini (1574–1654). It consists of a revolving solid equilateral triangular prism made of wood. On each of its three faces, a different scene is painted, so that, by quickly revolving the periaktos, another face can appear to the audience. Other solid polygons can be used, such as cubes, but triangular prisms offer the best combination of simplicity, speed and number of scenes per device.

A series of periaktoi positioned one after the other along the stage's depth can produce the illusion of a longer scene, composed by its faces as seen in perspective. These periaktoi must therefore be rotated simultaneously to a new position, thus achieving interesting illusions. This is made by coupling them by using sprocket gears at their bases and a flat chain or conveyor belt mechanical transmission system. A similar concept is used in some modern Trivision multi-message billboards, which are made up of a series of triangular prisms arranged so that they can be rotated to present three separate flat display surfaces in succession.

Early motion picture mechanical devices, such as the praxinoscope, were also based on rapidly rotating solid polygons, which had the successive animation or photographic plates affixed or projected to each face, thus providing the optical illusion of movement.

See also
 Scenic painting
 Scenography
 Set construction
 skênê
 Stagecraft
 Scenic design

External links
 Geauga Lyric Theatre Guild's The Sound of Music. Scene by scene breakdown of design, in which the use of periaktoi is illustrated very well.
 Early Illusionistic Scene Changes. In: The Development of Scenic Spectacle. This excellent article shows periaktoi inventions by Sabbatini, Furttenbach and Danti, with QuickTime animations and descriptions.
 The Praxinoscope
 Building Periaktoi, Edward R. Murrow HS Page showing the process of building Periaktoi for a high school production.

History of theatre
Scenic design